Rikimaru (力丸) is a fictional character in the Tenchu video game  series. He is featured in every game in the series, including as a player character in most of them. The character's critical reception was mostly positive as one of the more realistic ninja characters in video gaming and one of the earliest stealth game heroes.

Character design
Rikimaru was originally motion capture-portrayed by Sho Kosugi, a Japanese actor made famous by starring in a series of American ninja films in the early 1980s, whose son Kane Kosugi portrayed Rikimaru's nemesis Onikage. Rikimaru's characteristics include unusually white hair and a scar over his right eye yet maintaining the stereotypical hoodless ninja outfit including his long sleeved fishnet top under a vest, with baggy trousers and traditional ninja boots, while carrying a legendary sword named Izayoi granted to him by his master and mentor, Shiunsai. Compared to his female partner Ayame, Rikimaru's design did not change much through the series, with exception of the first sequel which featured the younger version of him and with no scar.

Appearances
 

Rikimaru is the current head of the Azuma Shinobi Ninja Clan and the series' primary protagonist. His master and predecessor as head of the clan was Shiunsai, who was killed by another member of the clan, Tatsumaru. Dedicated, honourable and withdrawn, Rikimaru is prepared to sacrifice his own life without hesitation, something he does at the end of Tenchu: Stealth Assassins only to reappear in Tenchu: Wrath of Heaven. His ability to retain his composure and sense of destiny allows him to undertake missions others would consider suicidal. He lacks speed in combat when compared to Ayame, but has greater strength and a greater control over his temper than his female companion. His primary rival in the series is Onikage, whom he fights in almost every game and usually defeats, only to have him coming back again due to his resurrection abilities and intense desire to defeat Rikimaru.

Years before the events of the games, Shiunsai received an order to assassinate a particular samurai. Together with several fellow ninja, he infiltrated the home of the samurai and killed him. As he and the other ninja were preparing to leave, the dead samurai's wife and servant discovered the ninja. The others quickly dispatched the wife and servant, but as they moved to silence the baby clutched in the dead wife's arms, Shiunsai stopped them from killing the baby boy. Taking pity on the boy, Shiunsai brought the baby home with him and raised it as if it were his own flesh and blood. Shiunsai was already raising Tatsumaru to become a ninja and he decided that the new baby would follow the same path. After the baby had grown into a young boy and started his training as a ninja, it became apparent that he was something of a weakling. 

Rikimaru's personality was different before the events of Tenchu 2: Birth of the Stealth Assassins. He believed that he was already good enough to defeat any opponent and his misplaced self-confidence would eventually earn him many painful experiences once he finally left his village, but those experiences would also be the source of great mental and spiritual growth. Rikimaru had bonds with two other ninja: Shiunsai and Tatsumaru. Both were very important to him, and both were lost. Shiunsai was a father figure to him, but Rikimaru showed only his student connection to Shiunsai, while Tatsumaru was like his older brother and role model. Suffering from a memory loss, Tatsumaru kills Shiunsai. Upon the recovery of his memory, he kills himself. This event marked the death of Rikimaru's former personality. Upon his master's death, Rikimaru takes the role of leader of the Azuma Ninja Clan at the age of 18.

Rikimaru wields the ancient sword Izayoi, which is passed on through the generations from leader to leader. Rikimaru took possession of the sword during the war with the Burning Dawn. Ayame defeated Tatsumaru, who had previously wielded Izayoi, and gave it to Rikimaru, effectively turning over leadership of the clan to him. Izayoi does have certain magical properties, and is also extremely strong and resilient to injury. The only time it has ever been damaged was during Rikimaru's duel with Dr. Kimaira in Wrath of Heaven, and it was promptly repaired by the clan's blacksmith, Ressai. When Tatsumaru killed Master Shiunsai, Rikimaru let his feelings take over and pursued the murderer. A fierce fight between the two took place, but eventually gaining the upper hand, Rikimaru hesitated. Tatsumaru takes that time to cut his right eye, leaving him scarred for life. Tatsumaru used to be Rikimaru's role model, but by now, Rikimaru has surpassed him in his spiritual and physical abilities.

By the time of Tenchu Z, the Azuma Ninja Clan was reduced to being made up of only two ninja left: Rikimaru and Ayame, who treats Rikimaru only as a companion. Even though both of them show loyalty and respect towards each other, not much compassion is felt between them. In Tenchu Z, the Ninja Master Rikimaru decides to train the next generation of Azuma Ninja and sends his newest ninja (the player's character and a companion of his choosing) to complete missions assigned to help the town of Gohda. He trained two young disciples before the events of the game, Kagemaru (male) and Shinobu (female). (Whatever the sex of the character the player chooses, the other new ninja will still die during the course of events.)

Action figures of the characters Rikimaru and Ayame were manufactured and released by Kotobukiya in 2003. Both figures are made of PVC and were sculpted after their appearances in Tenchu: Wrath of Heaven by Keiji Iwakure. Although categorized as action figures, these only feature movable wrist joints. The Rikimaru figure heights 105 mm. In 2009, Rikimaru made a cameo appearance in the video game 3D Dot Game Heroes.

Reception
The character was very well received. According to GamesRadar, "Rikimaru defined PSOne-era stealth action months before Solid Snake got around to it, and since then he's ninja'd his way through over a dozen games." CraveOnline compared Rikimaru and Ayame to "Batman with all their decoys, dog whistles, disguises, grappling hooks and other toys, an essential part of the ninja experience that had been missing from video games for far too long." In 2008, GamesRadar mentioned Rikimaru and Ayame in the list of the best assassins in the ninja category as "probably the most realistic depiction of ninjas ever to appear in a videogame." In 2009, GameDaily featured them in the article "Gaming's Greatest Patriots: Team Japan". Robert Workman of GameZone included both "the young, beautiful Ayame and the older, much more experienced Rikimaru" on his 2011 list of "best video game ninjas" as they "both are awesome when it comes to battle, as they leave their enemies laying in a bloody heap. What’s more, they can sneak around better than most anyone on this list." In 2012, What Culture put them at seventh spot on a list of unstoppable video game assassins, stating that "the deadly combination of Rikimaru and Ayame hasn’t rarely been matched in any game since."

Multiple publications praised Rikimaru on their lists of the top ninja characters in video games. In 2004, 1UP.com ranked him as the fourth best video game ninja yet and "the truest old-school ninja on this list." The Armchair Empire had Ayame and Rikimaru tied for sixth spot in on their 2006 list of ten best ninja characters; in 2010, Wild Gunmen ranked Rikimaru as the second best ninja in video game history for his use of stealth and being "a total badass." In 2011, Rikimaru was featured among the top ten ninja for PlayStation consoles by PLAY, and was also ranked eight on the Machinima.com's list of top ten ninja characters in all of gaming. Others also included him as one of the best video game assassins in general. FHM placed Rikimaru fourth on their 2009 list of most memorable hitmen in gaming. Complex included Rikimaru and Ayame from Tenchu 3 on a 2010 list of their favourite stealth killers in video games, stating: "When's the last time you saw a male/female duo this brutally deadly?" In their 2012 list, ZoominGames ranked Rikimaru as the third top assassin in games. In 2013, Complex ranked him as the tenth best assassin in video games, stating: "Nothing wrong with Ayame, but this master assassin just oozes pure awesome."

In an exception from a positive reception, Rikimaru and Ayame were included among "gaming's most shameful shinobi" by GamesRadar in 2006. Oddly, UGO.com called Rikimaru "Tenchu" while featuring "getting your neck stealthily sliced open" by "Tenchu" in their 2010 list of top worst ways to die in a video game. Virgin Media did include him on their list of top ten video game ninja heroes, but nevertheless also called him "pretty lacking in personality".

See also
Ninja in popular culture

References

External links
Rikimaru (IGN)
Rikimaru (IMDb)
Rikimaru (GiantBomb)
UGO's Ninja Guide | Rikimaru and Ayame of Tenchu (UGO.com)

Action-adventure game characters
Adoptee characters in video games
Fictional assassins in video games
Fantasy video game characters
Fictional Japanese people in video games
Fictional ninja
Male characters in video games
Ninja characters in video games
Orphan characters in video games
Fictional swordfighters in video games
Tenchu
Video game characters introduced in 1998
Video game protagonists
Video game characters who can turn invisible
Video game characters who use magic